The men's 200 metre individual medley competition of the swimming events at the 2011 World Aquatics Championships took place July 27 and 28. The heats and semifinals took place July 27 and the final was held July 28.

The two main contenders for the event were the reigning World Champion and world record holder Ryan Lochte and Michael Phelps, the reigning Olympic champion.  The final was won by Lochte in a world record time 1:54.00, bettering his previous time of 1:54.10.  Phelps finished in second place with a personal best time of 1:54.16.  So emphatic was Lochte and Phelps performance, that third-place finisher László Cseh said, "The Americans are too good for me. Only Ryan can beat Michael, but I can improve myself and continue to swim faster."

Record
Prior to the competition, the existing world and championship record were as follows.

The following record was established during the competition:

Results

Heats
47 swimmers participated in 6 heats.

Semifinals
The semifinals were held at 19:24.

Semifinal 1

Semifinal 2

Final

The final was held at 18:13.

References

External links
2011 World Aquatics Championships: Men's 200 metre individual medley entry list, from OmegaTiming.com; retrieved 2011-07-23.
FINA World Championships, Swimming: Ryan Lochte Sets First Long Course Post Techsuit-Era World Record, Swimming World Magazine (2011-07-28); retrieved 2011-08-11.
FINA World Championships, Swimming: At Long Last, A World Record Goes Down, Swimming World Magazine (2011-07-28); retrieved 2011-08-11.

Individual medley 200 metre, men's
World Aquatics Championships